The Pontiac Indians were a minor league baseball team based in Pontiac, Michigan. In 1912 and 1913, the Indians played exclusively as members of the Class D level Border League, hosting home games at Wisner Park.

History
In 1912, the Pontiac Indians became charter members of the Class D level Border League, which featured teams from both the United States and Canada. The 1912 five–team league featured the Mount Clemens Bathers, Port Huron Independents, Windsor and Wyandotte Alkalis joining the Indians in league beginning league play on May 30, 1912.

In their first season of play, the 1912 Pontiac Indians placed 2nd in the Border League standings. Beginning play on May 30, 1912, the Pontiac Indians ended the 1912 season with a record of 14–9, playing under manager Henry McIntoch. Pontiac finished 4.5 games behind the 1st place Wyandotte Alkalis (19–5) and ahead of Windsor (9–14), the Mount Clemens Bathers (11–15) and Port Huron Independents (7–17) in the final standings.

The Pontiac Indians played their final season in 1913. Beginning play on May 24, 1913, the Pontiac Indians placed 4th in the 1913 the Border League standings. Pontiac ended the 1913 season with a 13–18 record as Henry McIntosh returned as manager. The Indians finished 9.5 games behind the 1st place Ypsilanti, Michigan team in the six–team league.

The Border League folded after the 1913 season. Pontiac, Michigan has not hosted another minor league team.

The ballpark
Pontiac teams played minor league home games at Wisner Park. Wisner Park was located at Oakland Avenue & Summit Street near Wisner Street, Pontiac, Michigan. Today, Wisner Stadium serves as a multi–use stadium for local high schools and other events.

Timeline

Year–by–year records

Notable alumni

Bill Harper (1912)
Vern Spencer (1913)

See also
Pontiac Indians players

References

External links
 Baseball Reference

Defunct minor league baseball teams
Defunct baseball teams in Michigan
Baseball teams established in 1912
Baseball teams disestablished in 1913
Border League teams
Pontiac, Michigan